The John Deere Classic is a professional golf tournament on the PGA Tour. It is played annually in July, usually the week before The Open Championship, at TPC Deere Run in the Quad Cities community of Silvis, Illinois.

History
The tournament began as the Quad Cities Open in 1971 and was a "satellite event" on the PGA Tour. It became an official tour event in 1972. Ed McMahon served as tournament host from 1975 to 1979. Title sponsors have included Miller Brewing Company (1982–85), Hardee's (1986–94) and John Deere (since 1999).

From the event's inception in 1971 through 1974, it was played at Crow Valley Country Club in Davenport, Iowa. It then moved to Oakwood Country Club in Coal Valley, Illinois from 1975 to 1999. Beginning in 2000, the event has been at the TPC at Deere Run in Silvis.

In 2005 and 2006, the tournament generated more media coverage because of the sponsor's exemptions given to teenager Michelle Wie. The 2013 edition saw Jordan Spieth, two weeks shy of his 20th birthday, become the first teenager to win on the PGA Tour since 1931.

Since the introduction of the Open Qualifying Series, the John Deere Classic is a final chance for a player not already exempt to earn entry into The Open if he finished in the top five. In order to help attract players who will compete in the following week's Open Championship, since 2008 the John Deere Classic has sponsored a charter flight that leaves the Quad Cities on Sunday night and arrives in Britain the next morning.

Winners

Note: Green highlight indicates scoring records.
Sources:

Multiple winners
Through 2018, six men have won the John Deere Classic more than once.

3 wins
D. A. Weibring: 1979, 1991, 1995
Steve Stricker: 2009, 2010, 2011
2 wins
Deane Beman: 1971, 1972
Scott Hoch: 1980, 1984
David Frost: 1992, 1993
Jordan Spieth: 2013, 2015

Notes

References

External links

Coverage on the PGA Tour's official site
TPC Deere Run

PGA Tour events
Golf in Illinois
Golf in Iowa
Sports in the Quad Cities
Tourist attractions in Rock Island County, Illinois
Recurring sporting events established in 1971
John Deere